James Britt may refer to:

 James Jefferson Britt (1861–1939), American politician
 James Britt (American football) (born 1960), American football cornerback